Shahid Kapoor is an Indian actor. Kapoor is the recipient of three Filmfare Awards  Best Male Debut for Ishq Vishk (2003), Best Actor for Haider (2014) and Best Actor (Critics) for Udta Punjab (2016). He has received four additional Best Actor nominations at Filmfare for Jab We Met (2007), Kaminey (2009), Udta Punjab (2016) and Kabir Singh (2020). For his performance in Haider, Kapoor was also awarded the Screen Award for Best Actor and the Star Guild Award for Best Actor in a Leading Role among other awards.

BIG Star Entertainment Awards

Filmfare Awards

International Indian Film Academy Awards

Indian Television Academy Awards

Screen Awards

Stardust Awards

Star Guild Awards

Zee Cine Awards

Other awards

See also
 List of accolades received by Haider
 List of accolades received by Kaminey
 List of accolades received by Padmaavat

References

Lists of awards received by Indian actor
Awards